Ravi Sarma is an Indian actor who works in the Assamese cinema. He has starred in films like Hiya Diya Niya, Nayak, Iman Morom Kiyo Lage, Barood, Aami Asomiya etc. He is also a famous name in Assamese mobile theatre.

Personal life
Ravi Sarma was born in Guwahati, Assam. His paternal family hails from Nalbari. He did his  schooling from DAV School, Ulubari and Faculty High School. After that he went Cotton College for Higher Secondary and completed his graduation from Arya Vidyapeeth College. His mother Bandana Sarma is also an actress.
He is married to theatre artist Maitreyee Priyadarshini.

Career
Ravi Sarma's debut Assamese film was Hiya Diya Niya (2000), directed by renowned director Munin Barua, which was a super hit in the box office.

Filmography

Film

Short film/web series

Political life

Ravi Sarma has joined Bharatiya Janata Party on 2 August 2019.

He resigned from Bharatiya Janata Party to protest against the Centre’s move immediately after the Citizenship (Amendment) Bill, 2019, was tabled in the Lok Sabha on 9 December 2019.

References

External links

Ravi Sarma on Instagram

Year of birth unknown
Living people
Indian male film actors
Assamese actors
Male actors from Guwahati
Indian male stage actors
21st-century Indian male actors
1972 births